The Cutting Room is a music venue in New York City that was open at 19 West 24th Street from late 1999 through January 2009 for music of all varieties and reopened at the beginning of 2013 in a new location at 44 East 32nd Street. It was co-owned since its founding by actor  Chris Noth and Berklee College of Music alumnus Steve Walter.

Among those who have performed at The Cutting Room are Lizzy Grant, Norah Jones, Sheryl Crow, Gwyneth Paltrow, Kid Rock, Vanessa Carlton, Lady Gaga, Sandra Bernhard, Billy Joel, Mark Kostabi, Mini-Kiss, Edward W. Hardy, The Shells, David Duchovny and Gillian Anderson.

Noth met his wife Tara Lynn Wilson while she was working at The Cutting Room; the two had a boy (Orion Christopher Noth) in January 2008.

References

External links

Drinking establishments in Manhattan
Music venues in Manhattan
Nightlife in New York City
1999 establishments in New York City